Wei Yaxin (born 18 April 2000) is a Chinese badminton player. She affiliates with Hunan team.

Career 
Wei started her career in Changsa badminton team and later joined the Hunan provincial team in 2013.

Wei began the 2018 season as the finalists in the girls' singles event at the Dutch Junior Grand Prix. Wei was the champion at the 2019 Polish Open by beating Germany's Yvonne Li in 3 games. Apart from that, she has won medals in various other International events as well including bronze medals at the Asian and World Junior Championships.

Achievements

World Junior Championships 
Girls' singles

Asian Junior Championships 
Girls' singles

BWF World Tour (2 titles, 1 runner-up)
The BWF World Tour, which was announced on 19 March 2017 and implemented in 2018, is a series of elite badminton tournaments sanctioned by the Badminton World Federation (BWF). The BWF World Tour is divided into levels of World Tour Finals, Super 1000, Super 750, Super 500, Super 300, and the BWF Tour Super 100.

Mixed doubles

BWF International Challenge/Series (2 titles, 2 runners-up) 
Women's singles

Mixed doubles

  BWF International Challenge tournament
  BWF International Series tournament
  BWF Future Series tournament

BWF Junior International (2 runners-up) 
Girls' singles

  BWF Junior International Grand Prix tournament
  BWF Junior International Challenge tournament
  BWF Junior International Series tournament
  BWF Junior Future Series tournament

References

External links 

2000 births
Living people
Sportspeople from Changsha
Badminton players from Hunan
Chinese female badminton players